Al Morgan (1920–2011) was an American producer and writer.

Al Morgan may also refer to:
Al Morgan (musician) (1908–1974), American jazz musician
 Al Morgan (pianist) (1915–1989), American pianist and songwriter and star of The Al Morgan Show

See also
Albert Morgan (disambiguation)
Alex Morgan (disambiguation)
Alfred Morgan (disambiguation)
Alan Morgan (disambiguation)